Payback is a 1999 American neo-noir action thriller film
written and directed by Brian Helgeland in his directorial debut, and starring Mel Gibson, Gregg Henry, Maria Bello, and David Paymer. It is based on the novel The Hunter by Donald E. Westlake using the pseudonym Richard Stark, which had earlier been adapted into the 1967 film noir classic Point Blank, directed by John Boorman and starring Lee Marvin.

In 2006, Helgeland issued a director's cut that differs substantially from the version released by the studio.

Plot
Porter, a career thief and former U.S. Marine, lies facedown on the kitchen table of an unlicensed doctor, after having been shot twice and betrayed for $70,000. As the doctor uses the whiskey he is drinking as a sterilizing agent and digs out the bullets, Porter begins making his plans to get the money back and take revenge.

Broke after five months recuperating, Porter uses a series of petty thefts and short cons to quickly acquire $1,000 cash, a new suit, a revolver, and a few meals. He then begins tracking down his estranged wife Lynn and former partner-in-crime Val Resnick. In flashbacks, Porter recalls that they betrayed him following a $140,000 heist from local Chinese Triad. Resnick had manipulated Lynn into helping him with a picture showing Porter with another woman, a high-priced call girl named Rosie, and implying that the two were having an affair. Lynn shoots Porter, then she and Resnick leave Porter for dead. Val used the cash to buy his way back into "the Outfit," a local organized crime syndicate, by paying off his outstanding debt of $130,000 to them.

Porter first seeks out his wife, Lynn, out of loyalty to their marriage; however, she has been consumed by guilt and become addicted to heroin. Porter attempts to help her sober up by confining her and confiscating her drugs, but the next morning he finds her dead from an overdose using a hidden stash. Believing that Resnick was funding her drug habit, Porter interrogates Lynn's drug connection, who points him towards Resnick's middle-man, Arthur Stegman, a sleazy drug, muscle, and weapons supplier for the bottom rung of the criminal underworld. Porter finds Stegman in the company of two corrupt police detectives, Hicks and Leary, who threaten him for a share of the $70,000, once he acquires it.

Using Stegman's information, Porter enlists the help of Rosie, who is now affiliated with the Outfit. Rosie agrees, revealing that she still cares about Porter from when he was her bodyguard; Porter agrees, and the two lament that they never moved forward with their relationship, as they were each repelled by the others' career and Porter could not abandon Lynn. Rosie tells Porter that he can track Resnick through his employ of specialty prostitutes, as he is barred from soliciting Outfit call girls because his sadistic tendencies nearly killed one of them.

Porter finds Resnick during a session with a Triad-connected dominatrix named Pearl, when Porter ambushes him and demands his money. Fearful, Resnick later begs the Outfit for help but is told to solve his own problems. He then uses Pearl to frame Porter for the $140,000 heist so the Triads will kill him; however, this attempt fails. Resnick follows Porter's trail to Rosie's apartment, and beats and threatens to rape her when she fights back, as well as demanding to know Porter’s whereabouts. Porter arrives and wounds Resnick, who attempts to bargain for his life by giving him the names of the Outfit bosses Fairfax and Carter; since Resnick does not have the money, Porter kills him. He takes Rosie to a safe house, only to find that it is now compromised and rigged with plastic explosives, connected to the telephone by three of Carter's hitmen. Porter kills them and later confronts Carter in his own office, threatening to kill him unless he pays the $70,000. Carter states he is only an underboss, thus unauthorized to make financial decisions and calls Bronson, the head of the Outfit. During the negotiation, both Carter and Bronson believe that Porter is demanding the full $130,000 that Resnick paid the Outfit, though Porter repeatedly corrects them that all he wants is his share, which Resnick stole. When Bronson refuses over the phone, Porter carries out his threat and kills Carter. Porter then frames Hicks and Leary by planting Leary's fingerprints on the gun used to kill Resnick, as well as stealing Hicks's badge and leaving it with the gun in Resnick's hand.

With the aid of Rosie, Porter kidnaps Bronson's son, Johnny. He then visits and threatens Fairfax; Hicks and Leary, who are waiting outside Fairfax's house, are promptly arrested by Internal Affairs on account of the false evidence left earlier. A shootout ensues involving Porter, Stegman, his driver, Pearl and the Triads; only Porter and Pearl survive. Porter is held at gunpoint by Pearl which inadvertently causes him to be captured by Fairfax's men; he is taken to a warehouse and beaten for hours. Bronson arrives with his own men and the $130,000 ransom, though he swears that Porter will never lay his hands on it. Porter unsuccessfully tries to reason that all he wanted was the $70,000 that Resnick owed him, but Bronson then authorizes his men to hammer Porter's toes one-by-one, until he reveals Johnny's location; Bronson's men smash two toes before he gives them a location.

Bronson, Fairfax, and their men take Porter with them to investigate the address; however, the address is actually the compromised safe house wired with explosives. While they make their way to the apartment, Porter breaks free through the locked trunk and makes his way to the car's cell phone, and then dials the bomb's trigger just as they enter the room. The explosion kills Bronson, Fairfax, and their men, and Porter flees the scene to contact Rosie. Upon his arrival, Rosie leaves Johnny behind and joins Porter in the car to start new lives together, beginning by "going for breakfast...in Canada."

Cast
 Mel Gibson as Porter
 Gregg Henry as Val Resnick
 Maria Bello as Rosie
 Lucy Alexis Liu as Pearl
 Deborah Kara Unger as Lynn Porter
 David Paymer as Arthur Stegman
 Bill Duke as Detective Hicks
 Jack Conley as Detective Leary
 John Glover as Phil
 William Devane as Carter
 James Coburn as Justin Fairfax
 Kris Kristofferson as Bronson
 Trevor St. John as Johnny Bronson
 Freddy Rodriguez as Valet
 Manu Tupou as Pawnbroker

Production
The film was shot from September to November 1997, in Chicago and Los Angeles, though neither city is referred to in the film. Although credited as director, Brian Helgeland's cut of the film was not the theatrical version released to audiences. Helgeland notoriously clashed with producer Gibson over Gibson's ideas for the film. After the end of principal photography, Gibson admitted that he was instrumental in having Helgeland removed as director before the film was released. A script rewrite by Terry Hayes was ordered. There was initially some uncertainty on who directed the reshoots, with some sources claiming it was the production designer John Myhre. However, Paul Abascal has stated on his website that he in fact directed the new scenes. The new director reshot 30% of the film. The intent was to make the Porter character accessible. The film's tagline became: "Get Ready to Root for the Bad Guy." A potentially controversial scene between Porter and Lynn which arguably involves spousal abuse was excised and more plot elements were added to the third act. After 10 days of reshoots, a new opening scene and voiceover track also were added, and Kris Kristofferson walked on as a new villain.

Alternate version
Helgeland's version, Straight Up: The Director's Cut, was released on DVD, Blu-ray, and HD DVD on April 10, 2007, after an October 2006 run at the Austin Film Festival. The Director's Cut version features a female Bronson, that is never seen only heard over the phone voiced by Sally Kellerman, does not include the voice-over by Porter and several Bronson-related scenes. During their scuffle (which is longer than in the theatrical version and was the main source of controversy), Porter earlier tells Lynn that his picture with Rosie was taken before they met, thereby rendering her jealousy unjustified. This version has an entirely different, ambiguous ending where Porter is seriously wounded in a train station shootout and driven off by Rosie.

A June 4, 2012, look at "movies improved by directors' cuts" by The A.V. Club described Payback: Straight Up as "a marked improvement on the unrulier original."

Editing
Mel Gibson stated in a short interview released as a DVD extra that it "would've been ideal to shoot in black and white." He noted that "people want a color image" and that the actual film used a bleach bypass process to tint the film. In addition to this, the production design used muted shades of red, brown, and grey for costumes, sets, and cars for further effect.

Reception

Box office
Payback was well received at the box office. The film made $21,221,526 in its opening weekend in North America. It eventually grossed $81,526,121 in North America and $80,100,000 in other territories, totaling $161,626,121 worldwide.

Critical reception
The review-aggregation website Rotten Tomatoes gives Payback a score of 54% based on 74 reviews from critics, and a weighted average of 5.9 out of 10. The website's critical consensus states, "Sadistic violence and rote humor saddle a predictable action premise." Audiences polled by CinemaScore gave the film an average grade of "B−" on an A+ to F scale.

Roger Ebert gave the film a three-star rating (out of four) in his review, writing, "There is much cleverness and ingenuity in Payback, but Mel Gibson is the key. The movie wouldn't work with an actor who was heavy on his feet, or was too sincere about the material."

References

External links
 
 
 
 
 

1999 films
1999 action thriller films
1999 crime thriller films
American action thriller films
American crime thriller films
American gangster films
American black comedy films
1990s English-language films
Films about identity theft
American films about revenge
Films based on American novels
Films based on crime novels
Films based on works by Donald E. Westlake
Films set in the 1970s
American heist films
Icon Productions films
Paramount Pictures films
Warner Bros. films
American neo-noir films
Triad films
Films directed by Brian Helgeland
Films with screenplays by Brian Helgeland
Films produced by Bruce Davey
BDSM in films
1999 directorial debut films
1990s American films
1990s Hong Kong films